Bachia didactyla is a species of lizard in the family Gymnophthalmidae. It is endemic to Brazil.

References

Bachia
Reptiles described in 2011
Reptiles of Brazil
Endemic fauna of Brazil
Taxa named by Joseana Luisa de Freitas
Taxa named by Christine Strüssman
Taxa named by Marcos André de Carvalho
Taxa named by Ricardo Alexandre Kawashita-Ribeiro
Taxa named by Tami Mott